This is a round-up of the 1965 Sligo Senior Football Championship. Collooney Harps built on the promise shown in previous years to claim their third title and first since 1943, defeating St. Patrick's, now operating independently of Ballisodare, in the final.

Quarter-finals

Semi-finals

Sligo Senior Football Championship Final

References

 Sligo Champion (Summer-Autumn 1965)

Sligo Senior Football Championship
Sligo